The 2017 CAF Confederation Cup qualifying rounds were played from 10 February to 22 April 2017. A total of 68 teams competed in the qualifying rounds to decide the 16 places in the group stage of the 2017 CAF Confederation Cup.

Draw

The draw for the preliminary round and first round was held on 21 December 2016 at the CAF headquarters in Cairo, Egypt.

The entry round of the 52 teams entered into the draw was determined by their performances in the CAF competitions for the previous five seasons (CAF 5-Year Ranking points shown in parentheses).

Format

In the qualifying rounds, each tie was played on a home-and-away two-legged basis. If the aggregate score was tied after the second leg, the away goals rule would be applied, and if still tied, extra time would not be played, and the penalty shoot-out would be used to determine the winner (Regulations III. 13 & 14).

Schedule
The schedule of each round was as follows.

Bracket
The bracket of the draw was announced by the CAF on 21 December 2016.

The 16 winners of the first round advanced to the play-off round, where they were joined by the 16 losers of the Champions League first round.

Preliminary round
The preliminary round included the 40 teams that did not receive byes to the first round.

|}

JS Kabylie won 4–3 on aggregate.

Étoile du Congo won 3–0 on aggregate.

1–1 on aggregate. Al-Masry won 3–0 on penalties.

Yong Sports Academy won 2–1 on aggregate.

IR Tanger won 3–1 on aggregate.

SuperSport United won 2–1 on aggregate.

Renaissance du Congo won 1–0 on aggregate.

MC Alger won 5–3 on aggregate.

RSLAF won 2–1 on aggregate.

Platinum Stars won 2–0 on aggregate.

1–1 on aggregate. Vipers won on away goals.

Mbabane Swallows won 4–2 on aggregate.

Le Messager Ngozi won 4–2 on aggregate.

2–2 on aggregate. APEJES Academy won on away goals.

Rayon Sports won 6–0 on aggregate.

SC Gagnoa won 3–0 on aggregate.

MAS Fez won 3–2 on aggregate.

Ngezi Platinum won 2–1 on aggregate.

Al-Hilal Al-Ubayyid won 3–0 on aggregate.

1–1 on aggregate. Ulinzi Stars won 5–4 on penalties.

First round
The first round included 32 teams: the 20 winners of the preliminary round, and the 12 teams that received byes to this round.

|}

JS Kabylie won 1–0 on aggregate.

Al-Masry won on walkover after FIFA suspended the Malian Football Federation on 17 March 2017.

CS Sfaxien won 6–1 on aggregate.

IR Tanger won 3–1 on aggregate.

SuperSport United won 6–3 on aggregate.

MC Alger won 3–2 on aggregate.

Club Africain won on walkover after RSLAF withdrew prior to the second leg.

Platinum Stars won 3–2 on aggregate.

Mbabane Swallows won 3–1 on aggregate.

ZESCO United won 4–2 on aggregate.

ASEC Mimosas won 2–1 on aggregate.

Rayon Sports won on walkover after FIFA suspended the Malian Football Federation on 17 March 2017.

MAS Fez won 3–2 on aggregate.

Recreativo do Libolo won 2–1 on aggregate.

1–1 on aggregate. Al-Hilal Al-Ubayyid won 5–3 on penalties.

Smouha won 4–3 on aggregate.

Play-off round
The play-off round included 32 teams: the 16 winners of the Confederation Cup first round and the 16 losers of the Champions League first round.

The draw for the play-off round was held on 21 March 2017, 11:00 EET (UTC+2), at the CAF Headquarters in Cairo, Egypt. The winners of the Confederation Cup first round were drawn against the losers of the Champions League first round, with the teams from the Confederation Cup hosting the second leg.The 32 teams were seeded by their performances in the CAF competitions for the previous five seasons (CAF 5-Year Ranking points shown in parentheses):
Pot A contained the four highest-ranked losers of the Champions League first round.
Pot B contained the twelve lowest-ranked winners of the Confederation Cup first round.
Pot C contained the four highest-ranked winners of the Confederation Cup first round.
Pot D contained the twelve lowest-ranked losers of the Champions League first round.

First, a team from Pot A and a team from Pot B were drawn into four ties. Next, a team from Pot C and a team from Pot D were drawn into four ties. Finally, the remaining teams from Pot B and Pot D were drawn into the last eight ties.

The 16 winners of the play-off round advanced to the group stage.

|}

MC Alger won 4–1 on aggregate.

TP Mazembe won 2–0 on aggregate.

Mbabane Swallows won 4–3 on aggregate.

FUS Rabat won 3–2 on aggregate.

ZESCO United won 5–2 on aggregate.

CF Mounana won 2–1 on aggregate.

CS Sfaxien won 4–1 on aggregate.

Smouha won 1–0 on aggregate.

1–1 on aggregate. Recreativo do Libolo won on away goals.

1–1 on aggregate. KCCA won 4–3 on penalties.

Al-Hilal Al-Ubayyid won 4–1 on aggregate.

Club Africain won 6–3 on aggregate.

Rivers United won 2–0 on aggregate.

SuperSport United won 6–1 on aggregate.

2–2 on aggregate. Platinum Stars won 5–4 on penalties.

Horoya won 4–3 on aggregate.

Notes

References

External links
Total Confederation Cup 2017, CAFonline.com

1
February 2017 sports events in Africa
March 2017 sports events in Africa
April 2017 sports events in Africa